Zubair Ahmed Khan is a Pakistani politician who had been a Member of the Provincial Assembly of Sindh, from May 2013 to May 2018.

Early life and education
He was born on 41 December 1970 in Hyderabad, Pakistan.

He has a degree of Bachelor of Commerce, a degree of Master of Arts in Economics, and a degree of Master of Business Administration.

Political career

He was elected to the Provincial Assembly of Sindh as a candidate of Mutahida Quami Movement from Constituency PS-48 HYDERABAD-IV in 2013 Pakistani general election.

References

Living people
Sindh MPAs 2013–2018
1970 births
Muttahida Qaumi Movement politicians